Eugène Gaston Mestépès (1818 in Pau – 15 May 1875 in Paris) was a 19th-century French librettist, playwright and theatre director.

Biography 
Mestépès was essentially a librettist of operettas and opéras comiques. His plays were presented mainly at the Théâtre des Bouffes-Parisiens (Le violoneux, Le Roi Boit, Dragonette, Le Duel de Benjamin), the Théâtre-Lyrique (La Demoiselle d’honneur, Maître Griffard, Ondine) and the Fantaisies-Parisiennes (Les Deux Arlequins).

However, he worked on two great dramas: Christophe Colomb (1861) and Le Coup de Jarnac (1866).

Secretary of the Bouffes-Parisiens during the installation passage Choiseul, he ended up being associated with François Varcollier for the exploitation of the theater after the departure of Jacques Offenbach. He was general dramaturge of the Théâtre de l'Ambigu-Comique when he died.

Works 
1855: Le violoneux, one-act operetta by Jacques Offenbach, Bouffes-Parisiens, 31 August
1855: Le Duel de Benjamin, opérette de salon by Émile Jonas, libretto by Eugène Mestépès, Bouffes-Parisiens
1857: Les Trois Baisers du Diable, opéra fantastique in 1 act by Jacques Offenbach, Bouffes-Parisiens, 15 January
1857: Le Roi Boit, one-act operetta by Émile Jonas, libretto by Eugène Mestépès and Adolphe Jaime, Bouffes-Parisiens, 9 April
1857: Dragonette, one-act opéra-bouffe by Jacques Offenbach, libretto by Eugène Mestépès and Adolphe Jaime, Bouffes-Parisiens, 30 April
1857: Maître Griffard, one-act opéra comique by Léo Delibes, libretto by Eugène Mestépès and Adolphe Jaime, Théâtre-Lyrique, 3 October
1857: La Demoiselle d’honneur, three-act opéra comique by Théophile Semet, libretto by Eugène Mestépès and Sébastien Kauffmann, Théâtre-Lyrique, 30 December
1861: Christophe Colomb, drama in 5 acts and a prologue by Eugène Mestépès and Eugène Barré, Théâtre de la Gaîté, 30 August
1863: Ondine, three-act opéra comique by Théophile Semet, libretto by Eugène Mestépès and Lockroy, Théâtre-Lyrique, 7 January
1863: Job et son chien, one-act operetta by Émile Jonas, libretto by Eugène Mestépès and Ernest Buffault, Bouffes-Parisiens, 6 February
1865: Avant la noce, one-act operetta by Émile Jonas, libretto by Eugène Mestépès and Paul Boisselot, Bouffes-Parisiens, 24 March
1865: Les Deux Arlequins, one-act opéra comique by Émile Jonas, Fantaisies-Parisiennes, 29 December
1866: Le Coup de Jarnac, five-act historical drama by Eugène Mestépès and Couturier, music by Fossey, théâtre de la Gaîté, 20 February
1872: Sylvana, four-act opera by Carl Maria von Weber, arranged by Eugène Mestépès, Victor Wilder and Charles Constantin, Théâtre-Lyrique, 2 April

Sources 
 Journal pour tous, Paris, 18e année, n°32, Friday 21 May 1875, (p. 510).

References

External links 
 Eugène Mestépès on Wikisource
 

French theatre managers and producers
19th-century French dramatists and playwrights
French opera librettists
1820 births
People from Pau, Pyrénées-Atlantiques
1875 deaths